Pio Del Gaudio (born 24 April 1967, in Caserta, Italy) is an Italian politician and chartered accountant.

He is a member of the Forza Italia party. He was elected to the city council in 2006 and ran for mayor of Caserta in the 2011 municipal elections. He served as Mayor of Caserta from 2011 to 2015.

See also
 List of mayors of Caserta

References

External links
 Pio Del Gaudio on Openpolis
 Pio Del Gaudio on RadioRadicale.it
 Pio Del Gaudio on amministratori.interno.gov.it.

Living people
1967 births
People from Caserta
Forza Italia (2013) politicians
21st-century Italian politicians
20th-century Italian politicians
Mayors of Caserta